Duray is a Hungarian surname. 

 Arthur Duray (1882 – 1954) French-Belgian car racer and aviator
 Leon Duray  (1894 – 1956) American car racer
 Miklós Duray (1945 – 2022) Ethnic Hungarian politician in Slovakia. MP (1992 – 2010)
 Taras Duray (born 1984) Former Ukrainian professional football player

Surnames